Ral guanine nucleotide dissociation stimulator-like 2 is a protein that in humans is encoded by the RGL2 gene.

Interactions 

RGL2 has been shown to interact with HRAS.

References

Further reading